This is a list of lighthouses in Martinique.

Lighthouses

See also
 Lists of lighthouses and lightvessels

References

External links
 

Martinique
Martinique-related lists
Buildings and structures in Martinique
Transport in Martinique